Relevance logic, also called relevant logic, is a kind of non-classical logic requiring the antecedent and consequent of implications to be relevantly related. They may be viewed as a family of substructural or modal logics. It is generally, but not universally, called relevant logic by British and, especially, Australian logicians, and relevance logic by American logicians.

Relevance logic aims to capture aspects of implication that are ignored by the "material implication" operator in classical truth-functional logic, namely the notion of relevance between antecedent and conditional of a true implication.  This idea is not new: C. I. Lewis was led to invent modal logic, and specifically strict implication, on the grounds that classical logic grants paradoxes of material implication such as the principle that a falsehood implies any proposition.  Hence "if I'm a donkey, then two and two is four" is true when translated as a material implication, yet it seems intuitively false since a true implication must tie the antecedent and consequent together by some notion of relevance. And whether or not the speaker is a donkey seems in no way relevant to whether two and two is four.

In terms of a syntactical constraint for a propositional calculus, it is necessary, but not sufficient, that premises and conclusion share atomic formulae (formulae that do not contain any logical connectives). In a predicate calculus, relevance requires sharing of variables and constants between premises and conclusion. This can be ensured (along with stronger conditions) by, e.g., placing certain restrictions on the rules of a natural deduction system. In particular, a Fitch-style natural deduction can be adapted to accommodate relevance by introducing tags at the end of each line of an application of an inference indicating the premises relevant to the conclusion of the inference. Gentzen-style sequent calculi can be modified by removing the weakening rules that allow for the introduction of arbitrary formulae on the right or left side of the sequents.

A notable feature of relevance logics is that they are paraconsistent logics: the existence of a contradiction will not cause "explosion". This follows from the fact that a conditional with a contradictory antecedent that does not share any propositional or predicate letters with the consequent cannot be true (or derivable).

History

Relevance logic was proposed in 1928 by Soviet philosopher Ivan E. Orlov (1886 – circa 1936) in his strictly mathematical paper "The Logic of Compatibility of Propositions" published in Matematicheskii Sbornik. The basic idea of relevant implication appears in medieval logic, and some pioneering work was done by Ackermann, Moh, and Church in the 1950s. Drawing on them, Nuel Belnap and Alan Ross Anderson (with others) wrote the magnum opus of the subject, Entailment: The Logic of Relevance and Necessity in the 1970s (the second volume being published in the nineties). They focused on both systems of entailment and systems of relevance, where implications of the former kinds are supposed to be both relevant and necessary.

Axioms
The early developments in relevance logic focused on the stronger systems. The development of the Routley–Meyer semantics brought out a range of weaker logics. The weakest of these logics is the relevance logic B. It is axiomatized with the following axioms and rules.
 
 
 
 
 
 
 
 
 
The rules are the following.
 
 
 
 
 
Stronger logics can be obtained by adding any of the following axioms.
 
 
 
 
 
 
 
 
 
 
 
 
There are some notable logics stronger than B that can be obtained by adding axioms to B as follows.
 For DW, add axiom 1.
 For DJ, add axioms 1, 2.
 For TW, add axioms 1, 2, 3, 4.
 For RW, add axioms 1, 2, 3, 4, 8, 9.
 For T, add axioms 1, 2, 3, 4, 5, 6, 7, 11.
 For R, add axioms 1-11.
 For RM, add all the additional axioms.

Models

Routley–Meyer models
The standard model theory for relevance logics is the Routley-Meyer ternary-relational semantics developed by Richard Routley and Robert Meyer. A Routley-Meyer model M is a Routley-Meyer frame F together with a valuation, that assigns a truth value to each atomic proposition relative to each point . There are some conditions placed on Routley-Meyer frames.
 .
 .
 If , then .
One final condition on Routley-Meyer models is the hereditariness condition.
By an inductive argument, hereditariness can be shown to extend to complex formulas, using the truth conditions below.

The truth conditions for complex formulas are as follows.
  and 
  or 
 
 

A formula  holds in a model  just in case . A formula  holds on a frame  iff A holds in every model . A formula  is valid in a class of frames iff A holds on every frame in that class. 
The class of all Routley–Meyer frames satisfying the above conditions validates that relevance logic B. One can obtain Routley-Meyer frames for other relevance logics by placing appropriate restrictions on R and on *. These conditions are easier to state using some standard definitions. Some of the frame conditions and the axioms they validate are the following.

The last two conditions validate forms of weakening that relevance logics were originally developed to avoid. They are included to show the flexibility of the Routley–Meyer models.

Operational models

Urquhart models
Operational models for negation-free fragments of relevance logics were developed by Alasdair Urquhart in his PhD thesis and in subsequent work. The intuitive idea behind the operational models is that points in a model are pieces of information, and combining information supporting a conditional with the information supporting its antecedent yields some information that supports the consequent. Since the operational models do not generally interpret negation, this section will consider only languages with a conditional, conjunction, and disjunction.

Frames have conditions, some of which may be dropped to model different logics. The conditions Urquhart proposed to model the conditional of the relevance logic R are the following.
 
 
 
 
Under these conditions, the operational frame is a join-semilattice.

An operational model  is a frame  with a valuation  that maps pairs of points and atomic propositions to truth values, T or F.  can be extended to a valuation  on complex formulas as follows.
 , for atomic propositions
  and 
  or 
 

A formula  holds in a model  iff . A formula  is valid in a class of models  iff it holds in each model .

The conditional fragment of R is sound and complete with respect to the class of semilattice models. The logic with conjunction and disjunction is properly stronger than the conditional, conjunction, disjunction fragment of R. In particular, the formula  is valid for the operational models but it is invalid in R. The logic generated by the operational models for R has a complete axiomatic proof system, due Kit Fine and to Gerald Charlwood. Charlwood also provided a natural deduction system for the logic, which he proved equivalent to the axiomatic system. Charlwood showed that his natural deduction system is equivalent to a system provided by Dag Prawitz.

The accessibility relation is required to be reflexive and transitive, to capture the idea that E's conditional has an S4 necessity. The valuations then map triples of atomic propositions, points, and worlds to truth values. The truth condition for the conditional is changed to the following. 
 

The relation is required to obey the following conditions.
 
 If , then 
The truth condition for the conditional is changed to the following.
 

There are two ways to model the contraction-less relevance logics TW and RW  with the operational models. The first way is to drop the condition that . The second way is to keep the semilattice conditions on frames and add a binary relation, of disjointness to the frame. For these models, the truth conditions for the conditional is changed to the following, with the addition of the ordering in the case of TW.

Humberstone models
Urquhart showed that the semilattice logic for R is properly stronger than the positive fragment of R. Lloyd Humberstone provided an enrichment of the operational models that permitted a different truth condition for disjunction. The resulting class of models generates exactly the positive fragment of R.

The frame conditions are the following.

An operational model  is a frame  with a valuation  that maps pairs of points and atomic propositions to truth values, T or F.  can be extended to a valuation  on complex formulas as follows.
 , for atomic propositions
  and 
  and 
 

A formula  holds in a model  iff . A formula  is valid in a class of models  iff it holds in each model .

The positive fragment of R is sound and complete with respect to the class of these models. Humberstone's semantics can be adapted to model different logics by dropping or adding frame conditions as follows.

Algebraic models
Some relevance logics can be given algebraic models, such as the logic R. The algebraic structures for R are de Morgan monoids, which are sextuples  where
  is a distributive lattice with a unary operation,  obeying the laws  and if  then ;
 the monoid is lattice-ordered and satisfies ;
 ; and 
 if , then .
A de Morgan monoid is a residuated lattice, obeying the following residuation condition. 
 

An interpretation  is a homomorphism from the propositional language to a de Morgan monoid  such that 
  for all atomic propositions, 
 
 
 
 

Given a de Morgan monoid  and an interpretation , one can say that formula  holds on  just in case . A formula  is valid just in case it holds on all interpretations on all de Morgan monoids. The logic R is sound and complete for de Morgan monoids.

See also

 Connexive logic, a different approach to the paradoxes of material implication
 Non sequitur (logic)
 Relevant type system, a substructural type system

References

Bibliography
 Alan Ross Anderson and Nuel Belnap, 1975.  Entailment: the logic of relevance and necessity, vol. I.  Princeton University Press. 
 ------- and J. M. Dunn, 1992.  Entailment: the logic of relevance and necessity, vol. II, Princeton University Press.
 Mares, Edwin, and Meyer, R. K., 2001, "Relevant Logics", in Goble, Lou, ed., The Blackwell Guide to Philosophical Logic. Blackwell.
 Richard Routley, Val Plumwood, Robert K. Meyer, and Ross T. Brady. Relevant Logics and their Rivals. Ridgeview, 1982.
 R. Brady (ed.), Relevant Logics and their Rivals (Volume II), Aldershot: Ashgate, 2003.
 
 Alasdair Urquhart. The Semantics of Entailment. PhD thesis, University of Pittsburgh, 1972.
 Katalin Bimbó, Relevance logics, in Philosophy of Logic, D. Jacquette (ed.), (volume 5 of Handbook of the Philosophy of Science, D. Gabbay, P. Thagard, J. Woods (eds.)), Elsevier (North-Holland), 2006, pp. 723–789.
 J. Michael Dunn and Greg Restall. Relevance logic. In Handbook of Philosophical Logic, Volume 6, F. Guenthner and D. Gabbay (eds.), Dordrecht: Kluwer, 2002, pp. 1–136.
 Stephen Read, Relevant Logic, Oxford: Blackwell, 1988.

External links
Stanford Encyclopedia of Philosophy:  "Relevance logic" – by Edwin Mares.
Relevance logic – by J. Michael Dunn and Greg Restall
Relevant Logic – by Stephen Read

Substructural logic
Non-classical logic
Paraconsistent logic